People's democratic dictatorship is a phrase incorporated into the Constitution of the People's Republic of China. The premise of the "People's democratic dictatorship" is that the Chinese Communist Party (CCP) and state represent and act on behalf of the people, but in the preservation of the dictatorship of the proletariat, possess and may use powers against reactionary forces. Implicit in the concept of the people's democratic dictatorship is the notion that dictatorial control by the party is necessary to prevent the government from collapsing into a "dictatorship of the bourgeoisie", a liberal democracy, which, it is feared, would mean politicians acting in the interest of the bourgeoisie. This would be in opposition to the socialist charter of the CCP.

The concept, and form of government, is similar to that of people's democracy, which was implemented in a number of Central and Eastern European Communist-controlled states under the guidance of the Soviet Union.

Origins 
The concept of people's democratic dictatorship is rooted in the "new" type of democracy promoted by Mao Zedong in Yan'an during the Chinese Civil War. 

In a September 1948 report to the Politburo, Mao called for establishing "a people's democratic dictatorship based on an alliance of workers and peasants under proletarian leadership." According to Mao, this alliance "is not limited to workers and peasants, but is a people's democratic dictatorship that allows the participation of bourgeois democrats." 

The term's best known usage occurred on June30, 1949, in commemoration of the 28th Anniversary of the founding of the CCP. In his article, On the People's Democratic Dictatorship, Chairman Mao expounded his ideas about a People's Democratic Dictatorship as well as provided some rebuttals to criticism that he anticipated he would face.  

Mao also referenced the concept of people's democratic dictatorship in his opening and closing speeches at the September 1949 first meeting of the Chinese People's Political Consultative Conference (CPPC).

Political theory 
At its founding the PRC took the form of a people's democratic dictatorship. In a Maoist political framework, revolutionary consciousness and revolutionary activity distinguish "the people" from counter-revolutionaries. Within the PRC, the democracy includes united revolutionary classes and supportive political parties operating under the leadership of the CCP. It could include workers, peasants, intellectuals, petty bourgeoisie, and even national bourgeoisie who supported the revolutionary project. With regard to the inclusion of members of the national bourgeoisie, Mao stated, "[I]n order to counter the oppression of imperialism and improve its own underdeveloped economic status, China must use all the advantages of the national economy and the people's livelihood, not harmful urban and rural capitalist factors, to unite the national bourgeoisie and work together. Our current policy is to control capitalism, not to eliminate it."

"The people" thus encompasses the vast majority of the population. They can and are encouraged to participate democratically. Those regarded as counter-revolutionary are subject to the coercion implicit in the "dictatorship" until they are reformed. 

Mao stated that in this early period after the revolution, the focus is on "democracy for the people and dictatorship over the reactionaries." As historian Rebecca Karl summarizes:

People's democratic dictatorship is a method of democratic centralism which depends on the mass line.

See also 

 Aggravation of class struggle under socialism
 Dictatorship of the proletariat
 Marxism
 Marxism–Leninism
 Maoism
 Politics of the People's Republic of China

References

External links 

On the People's Democratic Dictatorship

Chinese words and phrases
Ideology of the Chinese Communist Party
Communist repression
Political repression in China
Mao Zedong
Dictatorship